Feds is a 1988 American comedy film written and directed by Dan Goldberg, and starring Rebecca De Mornay and Mary Gross. The plot follows two women, the ex-Marine Ellie and Bryn Mawr graduate Janis, who aim to become FBI Agents and enroll at the training center in Quantico. The ending credits stated the real FBI did not support the film or assist the production in any way.

Plot
Ellie DeWitt is a U.S. Marine veteran who wants to become an FBI Agent. However, while she has great physical skills, she struggles at the academic level. Conversely, her roommate Janis Zuckerman is highly intelligent, but physically very weak. Overcoming the male recruits' assumptions of them, Ellie and Janis team up to help each other through the basic training so they can both become federal agents.

During their training, Ellie and Janis must deal with an instructor who seems determined to fail the pair, a fellow trainee who seems more interested in flirting with Ellie (until Ellie asserts her Marine training and pins him against the wall in one exercise), and befriend a geeky co-trainee who seems unable to complete the smallest task.

Joining forces, the three tackle the final practice simulation, (badly) forging the instructor's signature ('he sneezed') and breaking into the telephone room to discover the location of the "hostage". They also use their radio to mislead the other agents into a swamp to make sure they do not find the hostage first.

The two graduate with honors and in the credits scene, both Ellie and Janis are assigned as partners to the Los Angeles office.

Cast
 Rebecca De Mornay as Elizabeth 'Ellie' De Witt
 Mary Gross as Janis Zuckerman
 Ken Marshall as Brent Shepard
 Fred Dalton Thompson as FBI Agent Bill Bilecki
 Larry Cedar as Howard Butz
 Raymond Singer as George Hupperman
 James Luisi as FBI Agent Sperry
 Jon Cedar as FBI Senior Agent
 Rex Ryon as Parker
 Norman Bernard as Bickerstaff
 Bradley Weissman as Graham
 Don Stark as Willy
 David Sherrill as Duane
 Michael Chieffo as Louie
 Geoffrey Thorne as College Jock #3
 Lee Arnone as Female Marine
 Rick Avery as Bank Robber #3
 Tony Longo as Sailor

Production 
Dan Goldberg and Len Blum, the screenwriters behind Meatballs and Stripes, originally planned to make a film about "the daffy, goofy sex-crazed guys at the FBI academy." When they couldn't get stars of previous Ivan Reitman films like Bill Murray or Dan Aykroyd to sign on, the pair switched the story mid-script to a female-focused film.

Feds was made during a cycle of American cop comedies that came out after the box-office success of Police Academy (1984). These films included Police Academy's sequels, Night Patrol (1984), Moving Violations (1985), Off Beat (1986), and Hollywood Vice Squad (1986).

Critical reception 
Feds received mixed reviews from critics. Michael Wilmington of the Los Angeles Times wrote, "The stars--De Mornay as the brawn and Gross as the brains--are good enough to make this dopey idea work. But Blum and Goldberg don’t give them much better than the usual parade of elephantine slapstick, grotesque topical humor, sexual innuendo and rock ‘n’ roll sound bites." Rita Kempley of The Washington Post wrote negatively of the film and said De Mornay and Gross are "playing badly written, weirdly reactionary parts." Time Out said, "director Goldberg seems uncertain whether he should be aiming for slapstick or an earnest docu-drama about sexism in the FBI."

Andi Zeisler of Bitch magazine pointed out Feds was the first female buddy cop movie when critics, writing of the 2013 comedy film The Heat, mistakenly referred to it as the first-ever film about female buddy cops.

Home media 
Feds was released on DVD by Warner Bros. on July 7, 2010.

References

External links

Feds at AllMovie

1988 films
1988 comedy films
American comedy films
Films about the Federal Bureau of Investigation
Warner Bros. films
Films scored by Randy Edelman
1988 directorial debut films
1980s police comedy films
1980s buddy cop films
American buddy cop films
1980s female buddy films
Girls with guns films
1980s English-language films
1980s American films